Redirected walking is a virtual reality locomotion technique that enables users to explore a virtual world that is considerably larger than the tracked working space. With this approach the user is redirected through manipulations applied to the displayed scene, causing users to unknowingly compensate for scene motion by repositioning and/or reorienting themselves.

References

Virtual reality